Tartronic acid or 2-hydroxymalonic acid is an organic compound with the structural formula of HOHC(CO2H)2. This dicarboxylic acid is related to malonic acid. It is a white solid. It is produced by oxidation of glycerol:

Glyceric acid  is an intermediate.

Its derivative, 2-methyltartronic acid, is isomalic acid.

Uses
Oxidation of tartronic acid gives the ketone mesoxalic acid, the simplest oxodicarboxylic acid.

References

External links
 US-Patent 4319045: "Process for production of a tartronic acid solution", max 20% Tartronic acid besides other dicarbonic acids
 US-Patent 5750037: Use of tartronic acid as an oxygen scavenger
 Literature overview about synthesis

Dicarboxylic acids
Alpha hydroxy acids